Eugynolaelaps is a genus of mites in the family Laelapidae.

Species
 Eugynolaelaps coriaceus Berlese, 1918

References

Laelapidae